Balidaan ( Sacrifice) is a 1985 Hindi-language action film, produced by Salim under the Aftab Pictures Pvt. Ltd. banner and directed by S.A. Chandra Shekaran. It stars Jeetendra, Sridevi  and music composed by Bappi Lahari. The film is remake of the Malayalam film Raktham (1981) which the director had earlier remade in  Telugu as Balidanam (1982) starring Sobhan Babu, Madhavi in the pivotal roles and in Tamil as Saatchi.

Plot
Inspector Vijay (Jeetendra) lives a wealthy lifestyle in Bombay along with his aunt while his father, retired major Prem Kishan (Shammi Kapoor) lives in the countryside in a farmhouse. Vijay meets and falls in love with Uma (Sridevi), who lives opposite his house along with her father, Jagmohan (Pinchoo Kapoor) and his mother Janki (Shubha Khote). When Jagmohan finds out that Uma and Vijay are in love, he forbids her to see him, but subsequently relents when she takes poison. Both Vijay and Uma get married and shortly thereafter give birth to a girl Pinky. After some time Vijay has been specially appointed by the government to catch dangerous, deadly criminal Bade (Kader Khan) who is the leader of a bandit's gang, once they stop a wedding party bus on the Bombay-Poona Highway, loot, sexually molest females, and kill several passengers, Vijay is successful in arresting one of the gangsters, a Hotel Manager named Ranga, who colluded with the bandits, but Advocate Ghaswala (Asrani) defends him and gets him acquitted, resulting in the killing of the only eye-witness, a 10-year-old boy. In retaliation, Vijay beats up and kills Ranga, which results in his suspension. Then Vijay starts getting threats and has a bomb planted in his house. The panic-stricken family flees to the farmhouse, but bandits locate them there also and forcibly abduct Uma and Pinky after assaulting Prem Kishan. Vijay must now rush to save his wife and daughter, but he could save only his daughter; Uma dies by falling under the train. Now Vijay decides to take revenge against Badey and his gang, he eliminates them one by one and finally, surrenders him to the judiciary.

Cast

Shammi Kapoor as Retired Major Prem Kishan
Jeetendra as Inspector Vijay Prem Kishan
Sridevi as Uma
Kader Khan as Bade 
Shakti Kapoor as Johny "Chhote"
Dina Pathak as Bua
Asrani as Advocate Ghaswala 
Vijay Arora 
Pinchoo Kapoor as Jagmohan 
Shubha Khote as Janki
Birbal as Constable
Brahm Bhardwaj as Judge
Bharat Kapoor as Jaggu
Gurbachan Singh
Bindu
Anuradha as Item Dancer

Soundtrack
All songs were written by Farooq Kaiser while "Aaja Ek Ho Ja" was penned by Indeevar.

References

External links
 

1985 films
1980s Hindi-language films
Films scored by Bappi Lahiri
Hindi remakes of Telugu films
Films directed by S. A. Chandrasekhar